The Special Communications Organization (SCO) is Pakistani public sector organization operated by MoIT&T. SCO plays a role in providing telecommunication services in Azad Kashmir and Gilgit Baltistan to almost 1.7 million people, a quarter of the total population.

History

SCO is a public sector organization working under Ministry of Information Technology and Telecommunication (MoITT) of Government of Pakistan (GOP), established in 1976 to develop, operate and maintain telecom services in Azad Jammu & Kashmir and Gilgit Baltistan after then Prime Minister Zulfikar Ali Bhutto “found himself cut off from the rest of the world” during a trip to Kashmir and Gilgit.

Over the period of time, SCO has developed massive IT & Telecom infrastructure including laying of over 2500 kilometer Optical Fiber Cable network across the entire length and breadth of the area. Today, SCO stands the largest telecom network / service provider equally focusing on urban and rural areas development. SCO is providing telecom services to both public and private sector (general populace) in Azad Jammu & Kashmir and Gilgit Baltistan region. It has a unique distinction of providing all brands of telecom services from voice to data under one platform.

Services

NGMS 
SCO’s mobile network, SCOM, stands as the first telecom network provider which focuses on providing 2G/3G and 4G services in the urban and rural parts of Gilgit-Baltistan and Azad Kashmir in both the Public and Private sector. SCO is also the largest backbone service provider in Azad Jammu & Kashmir and Gilgit-Baltistan, having more than 4,800 kilometers of optical fiber in the region.

Government of Pakistan has assigned SCO to lay down 820 kilometer long Pakistan-China Fiber Optic Project, an optical fiber cable that will enhance telecommunication in the Gilgit-Baltistan region, while offering Pakistan a fifth route by which to transmit telecommunication traffic. As of February 2018, Special Communications Organization (SCO) has been given the NOC to start trials for 3G and 4G (NGMS) services in Azad Jammu & Kashmir and Gilgit Baltistan. The service was available in Mirpur, Muzaffarabad, Kotli, Skardu and Gilgit free of cost until trials had been completed.

SCOM are the first network to have installed a mobile tower at the K2 base camp where previously satellite phones would be used for communication.

Broadband 
In addition to the mobile services, SCO is also providing wired fixed line services to almost 20,900 people by which DSL and WiFi services are provided under the brand name of SNET. SCO plans to deploy FTTH system to provide gigabit broadband services in 2020.

Banking
Mobile Financial Services - "S-Paisa"
In July, 2019; A brand envisioned as ‘S-Paisa,’ is aimed to empower more than 6 million people of Azad Jammu & Kashmir and Gilgit-Baltistan through state-of-the-art, convenient and secure branchless banking services. The partnership of JS Bank with the forefront telco will financially empower the un-banked in these regions.

Controversies

SCO is often criticized for poor performance and creating obstacles for other carriers in providing telecom services in AJK. SCO was given sole monopoly in AJK and the area as a result suffered and lacked in modern telecom services. However, after the 2005 quake, significant loss of life was attributed to not having communication facilities in the area. Subsequent protests resulted in government of Pakistan opening up the Azad Jammu and Kashmir for mobile operators which has significantly improved mobile services in the area.

However, Azad Jammu and Kashmir still lags behind in broadband services due to strict hold of SCO on the network access. SCO has created major hurdle in opening up 3G/4G in the AJK as it is not able to upgrade its network and is certain to lose whatever market share it has if the other operators are allowed to offer 3G/4G services. The Government of Pakistan gave approval for funding for SCO to upgrade its network which may remove this hurdle for 3G/4G services in AJ&K.

See also 
 List of dialing codes of Pakistan
 Telephone numbers in Pakistan
 Ministry of Information Technology and Telecommunication
 Pakistan Army

References

External links
 SCO official website
 MoITT official website

Pakistan Army affiliated organizations
Telecommunications in Pakistan
1976 establishments in Pakistan
Government agencies established in 1976
Economy of Gilgit-Baltistan
Economy of Azad Kashmir
Government-owned telecommunications companies